The monastery of Cantauque, officially the Monastery of the Theotokos and Saint Martin, is a Romanian Orthodox foundation located in southern France, in the commune of Villebazy, about 30 kilometers from Carcassonne, Aude.  It was founded in 2002.

References

External links

Christian monasteries in France
Romanian Orthodox monasteries outside Romania